Eupithecia karadaghensis is a moth in the family Geometridae. It is found in Ukraine.

References

Moths described in 1988
karadaghensis
Moths of Europe